New York's 41st State Senate district is one of 63 districts in the New York State Senate. It has been represented by Republican Sue Serino since 2015, following her defeat of incumbent Democrat Terry Gipson.

Geography
District 41 is located in the Hudson Valley, incorporating almost all of Dutchess County, including the city and town of Poughkeepsie, and the western half of Putnam County.

The district overlaps with New York's 18th and 19th congressional districts, and with the 94th, 95th, 103rd, 104th, 105th, and 106th districts of the New York State Assembly.

Recent election results

2020

2018

2016

2014

2012

Federal results in District 41

References

41